Helblindi (Old Norse: , 'Helblind') is a jötunn in Norse mythology. According to 13th-century poet Snorri Sturluson, he is the brother of Loki and Býleistr.

Name  
The Old Norse name Helblindi has been translated as 'Helblind'.

Helblindi is also one of the many names of the god Odin, as found in Grímnismál (The Lay of Grímnir) or Gylfaginning (The Beguiling of Gylfi).

Attestations 
In the Prose Edda, Helblindi is several times noted as the brother of Loki and, implicitly, as the son of Laufey and Fárbauti.

Theories 
Although it is not directly attested in original sources, scholars have considered Helblindi to be a son of Fárbauti. His exact role in the ancient mythic complex surrounding Loki's family remains unclear, however.

References

Bibliography 

Jötnar
Names of Odin
Loki